Tom Stern is an American actor, director, writer, and producer.

Education
Stern grew up in Pleasantville, New York and attended Byram Hills High School in Armonk, New York, and then went to film school at Tisch School of the Arts New York University (NYU) from 1983–87, where he met Alex Winter. The two collaborated on a number of short films including Squeal of Death, which was noticed by an executive at Columbia Pictures in 1986. After graduating the pair went to Hollywood and directed IMPACT video magazine, which feature artists and performers such as Bill Hicks, Survival Research Labs, Public Enemy, Robert Williams, Jane's Addiction, and another short film with Butthole Surfers.

Hollywood
In 1987 Stern and Winter drove to Hollywood and sent a copy of Squeal of Death to Sam Raimi, whose film Evil Dead 2 was an inspiration to them. Raimi responded enthusiastically. He and his partner Rob Tapert optioned an anthology comedy feature film script from Stern and Winter. The pair then worked on a number of short films and music videos for bands such as Red Hot Chili Peppers and Ice Cube.

Stern and Winter teamed up with writer Tim Burns on The Idiot Box, with Stern and Winter also co-starring and co-directing.

Immediately following The Idiot Box, Stern, Winter and Burns co-wrote the 1993 film Freaked with Stern and Winter also serving as co-directors. Freaked starred Winter, Randy Quaid, Keanu Reeves, Bobcat Goldthwait and Mr. T. The film gained a cult following and in 2013 played at Cinefamily in Los Angeles in celebration of the 20th anniversary of its release.

Stern also co-wrote the screenplay to An American Werewolf in Paris, the sequel to the 1981 film An American Werewolf in London, with Burns and Anthony Waller.

Stern and Burns also collaborated on The Chimp Channel.

Stern has worked with Jimmy Kimmel's production company Jackhole Productions on shows such as Jimmy Kimmel Live!, The Man Show as segment director, and Crank Yankers as director and supervising producer. In addition, Stern appeared as an actor and worked as a writer for Trey Parker and Matt Stone's presidential parody, That's My Bush!, as co-executive producer, served as director and writer for The Andy Milonakis Show, and was one of the creators and producers of the Comedy Central travel show parody Gerhard Reinke's Wanderlust.

Stern was recently writer/director/producer on a live action SpongeBob SquarePants special titled SpongeBob Appreciation Day: Patchy's Beach Bash!, starring Tom Kenny, Jon Heder, Rob Riggle, Meghan Trainor and Anthony Davis which premiered on Nickelodeon on January 4, 2020. Stern was also recently showrunner/director on two Netflix shows: Kevin Hart's Guide to Black History and The Toys That Made Us. His short film Adams, which he produced, directed and adapted from the George Saunders story, stars Patton Oswalt and Fred Armisen, and recently won Best Comedy at the HollyShorts Film Festival, where the jury included Anthony Russo and Matthew Modine. Other recent shows directed by Stern include Comedy Central's rebooted Crank Yankers, Fox's What Just Happened with Fred Savage, and the Jim Henson Company's upcoming animatronic alien show for Disney +.

Filmography
The Toys That Made Us (2017) - Director 
Kevin Hart's Guide to Black History (2017) - Director
2 Broke Girls (2015) - Director
Hollywood Hillbillies (2014) - Executive Producer
Urban Tarzan (2012) - Executive Producer
Joe Schmo: The Full Bounty (2012) - Director
Stevie TV (2012, 2013) - Director, co-executive producer
Marc Saves America (2011) - Director, Executive Producer
1000 Ways to Die (2010) - Supervising Producer
Alligator Boots (2008) - Director
Harden High (2007) - Writer Director Executive Producer, Co-Creator with Jason Jordan
Saul of the Mole Men (2007) - Writer, Director, Executive Producer
The Andy Milonakis Show (2005) - Writer, Director, Executive Producer
Gerhard Reinke's Wanderlust (2003) - Writer, Director, Executive Producer
Jimmy Kimmel Live! (2003) - Director
That's My Bush! (2001) - Writer
The Chimp Channel (1999) - Writer, Producer
The Man Show (1999) - Director
An American Werewolf in Paris (1997) - Co-writer
Freaked (1993) - Co-Writer, Co-director, Actor
The Idiot Box (1991) - Writer, Actor, Co-director

Music videos
Butthole Surfers - "Cherub" (live at CBGB, February 12, 1986)
Red Hot Chili Peppers - "Taste the Pain" (1990) (co-directed by Alex Winter)
Ice Cube - "Who's the Mack" (1990) (co-directed by Alex Winter)
Human Radio - "Me and Elvis" (1990) (co-directed by Alex Winter)
Extreme - "Decadence Dance" (1990) (co-directed by Alex Winter)
Marilyn Manson - "Dope Hat" (1995)
Spork - "Naked Invasion" (1996)
ANJ - "Gorbachev" (2008)

References

External links 

Tom Stern at the Internet Music Video Database
Freekland: The Official Homepage of Alex Winter, Tom Stern and Tim Burns

Tisch School of the Arts alumni
American film directors
American male screenwriters
American male television actors
American music video directors
American television directors
Television producers from New York (state)
Living people
People from Armonk, New York
1960s births
Screenwriters from New York (state)